Nanoeconomics is defined as the economic theory of single transactions. The term was proposed by Kenneth J. Arrow in 1987. The term has also been used to describe a level of analysis below traditional microeconomics, which is equivalent to the first definition and to describe the economics of nanotechnology.

See also 

Agential realism
Information economics
Postpositivism
Quantum pseudo-telepathy
Quantum social science

References

Microeconomics